The Hot Springs Bathers were a Cotton States League baseball team based in Hot Springs, Arkansas, United States, that played from 1938 to 1941 and from 1947 to 1955. In 1938, they were affiliated with the Chicago Cubs. In 1939 and 1940, they were affiliated with the Detroit Tigers. From 1948 to 1951, they were affiliated with the Chicago White Sox. They were affiliated with the St. Louis Cardinals in 1954 and the Kansas City Athletics in 1955. From 1938 to 1941, they played at Whittington Park/Ban Johnson Park, and from 1947 to 1955 they played at Bathers Field/Jaycee Park/Majestic Park.

In 1953, the Cotton States League attempted to evict the Bathers from the league because they signed and planned to play two African-American baseball players, brothers Jim and Leander Tugerson. The eviction was not permanent, however the brothers were never able to play in any regular season games for the team.

League championships
They won their first championship in 1941 under manager Mike Powers. Under Joe Holden and George Sobek, they won again in 1948. In 1950, they won their final championship under John Antonelli.

Notable alumni

 Paul Dean (1954, MGR)
 Bill Fischer (1949)
 Pete Fox (1949) MLB All-Star
 Shanty Hogan (1952, MGR)
 Joe Kuhel (1947)
Mickey O'Neil (1955, MGR)

References

External links
Baseball Reference

Baseball teams established in 1887
Baseball teams disestablished in 1955
Defunct Cotton States League teams
Defunct Arkansas State League teams
Defunct Southwestern League teams
Kansas City Athletics minor league affiliates
St. Louis Cardinals minor league affiliates
Chicago White Sox minor league affiliates
Chicago Cubs minor league affiliates
Detroit Tigers minor league affiliates
Hot Springs, Arkansas
Professional baseball teams in Arkansas
Defunct baseball teams in Arkansas
History of African-American civil rights